Sikhvoran (also Romanized as Sīkhvorān, Sīkhowrān, and Sīkhūrān; also known as Sīkhorān) is a village in Soghan Rural District, Soghan District, Arzuiyeh County, Kerman Province, Iran. At the 2006 census, its population was 45, in 17 families.

References 

Populated places in Arzuiyeh County